Sandra Silvana Gallardo (January 13, 1953 – January 2, 2012) was an American film and television actress.

Born in New York City, Gallardo's television credits include episodes of Starsky & Hutch, Lou Grant, Quincy, Hill Street Blues, Cagney & Lacey, Kojak, Falcon Crest, Trapper John, M.D., The Golden Girls, Knots Landing, MacGyver, L.A. Law, Babylon 5, ER and NYPD Blue. She also appeared in films including Windwalker, Death Wish II, and Silence of the Heart. She was also an acting coach and writer.

Personal life
Sandra Silvana Gallardo was the creator of the "Gallardo Method," a method of acting where "there are no boundaries, there are no limits, there simply is The Art of the Infinite Possibility." Gallardo was told at an early age, "You can't change the world". 'Perhaps not," She said. "But I sure can try." This message was carried throughout her life in her teachings.

Silvana grew up on Fox Street in the South Bronx - a street where 90% of the residents there died of other than natural causes (from New York Times article). She was of Venezuelan, Sicilian and Cuban descent and proud of her Native American ancestry. She attended Morris High School and was taught by Herbert Fein, then Chairman of the Music Department, who became a formative figure in her acting career. Silvana entered a drama school, the HB Studio in Greenwich Village. There she studied with James Patterson, a Tony Award-winning actor. Her life and work were  forever changed. She was also aware of Walter Lott, another student of Stanislavski's system. Although she had never studied with Lott, she was inspired by his teachings.

Silvana began her teaching career in NYC, and was also a track star - running and winning NYC Championship for the relay.  She was coached by Sunny Pomales, a man who demanded the best from her. In Silvana's first film, Windwalker, she had to do a scene where she had to run full out. After several takes she was told to slow down. The camera was having a hard time recording her speed. Gallardo taught and coached some of Hollywood's biggest stars, including Angelina Jolie, Keanu Reeves, Billy Drago and Peta Wilson. 

She moved to Paris after having directed Fading To Zero, a feature docudrama based on the life and work of the late Brooklyn Poet Laureate Ken Siegelman.

While residing in Paris, Kentucky, Gallardo died on January 2, 2012, eleven days before her 59th birthday, at Jewish Hospital, Louisville. A cause of death was not released.

Filmography

References

Further reading
Talbot, Paul. "Exclusive Interviews: The Women of 'Death Wish II" Cinema Retro. January 2007.

External links

1953 births
2012 deaths
American film actresses
American television actresses
Actresses from New York City
American people of Venezuelan descent
American people of Cuban descent
American people of Italian descent
Deaths from cancer in Kentucky
20th-century American actresses
21st-century American actresses
People from Paris, Kentucky